The Girl Called Hatter Fox is a 1977 American TV movie starring Ronny Cox and directed by George Schaefer.

It was the first film produced by EMI Television (they released The Amazing Howard Hughes, but bought the production company during production.) The movie, based on the bestselling novel by Marilyn Harris, marked the first time a Native American actress (Joanelle Romero) played a leading role.

Cast
Joanelle Romero
Ronny Cox
Conchata Ferrell

References

External links

1977 films
Films directed by George Schaefer
American television films